The House of Mrnjavčević (Mrnjavčevići / Мрњавчевићи) was a medieval Serbian noble house during the Serbian Empire, its fall, and the subsequent years when it held a region of present-day Macedonia region. The house ruled a province from its base at Prilep (in modern North Macedonia) from 1366 to 1395.

Vukašin Mrnjavčević was a military commander in the army of Emperor Dušan the Mighty ( 1331-1355) and co-ruler of Serbia as king, with Emperor Uroš the Weak ( 1355-1371). After Uroš' death, the Serbian Empire crumbled, as the nobility could not agree on its rightful successor. Vukašin's son, Marko Kraljević, ruled his hereditary lands as titular King of Serbs and Greeks.

History

Origin
The family's progenitor, after whom historiography names it, was Mrnjava, a financial chancellor (kaznac, chamberlain) who served King Stefan Uroš I and his wife, Queen Helen of Anjou at the court at Trebinje (in Travunia). According to Ragusan historian Mavro Orbin (1563–1610) wrote that the family hailed from Hum, and that the poor Mrnjava and his three sons, who later lived in Blagaj, quickly rose to prominence under King Stefan Dušan. Possibly, the family had left Hum, which had been part of the Serbian Kingdom, after the Bosnian conquest of Hum (1326), and settled in Livno (where Vukašin was allegedly born). The family most likely supported Dušan's Bosnian campaign (1350), in which he saw to reconquer Hum.

Reign of Stefan Dušan

Reign of Uroš IV

Family tree

Mrnjava ( 1280–89), a treasurer of Queen Helen of Anjou
Vukašin (1320–1371), King and Lord of the Serbian and Greek Lands, and of the Western Provinces (1366–71)
Marko (1335–1395), Young King, titular King of Serbs (1371–95)
Andrijaš (fl. 1371–95)
Ivaniš
Dmitar ( 1365–d. 1410)
 Olivera
Jovan Uglješa (1320s–1371), despot, ruler of Serres (1356–71)
Tvrtko
Uglješa
 Eupraxia

See also
List of Serbian monarchs

References

Sources
 
 

 
Serbian noble families
Serbian Empire
14th century in Serbia
Medieval Macedonia
People from Prilep
Serbian royal families